Dick McBride may refer to:
 Dick McBride (baseball)
 Dick McBride (poet)